Valerie Brandes is a British publisher who is the founder and CEO of Jacaranda Books, a diversity-led publishing house established in 2012. She was born in London, and studied American and Commonwealth Arts before taking a master's degree in Publishing Studies. She worked for Barnes and Noble and Profile Books before setting up Jacaranda Books.

Brandes was listed consecutively in the Powerlist 2018 and Powerlist 2019 as one of the 100 most influential black Britons. In June 2021 she was an invited speaker at the online London Book Fair.

References

British_publishers_(people)
Year of birth missing (living people)
Living people